Lodde is a 2015 Indian Kannada-language romantic comedy film directed by S. V. Suresh Raj and written by Shrinath. It stars Komal Kumar and Akanksha Puri. The film is produced by Manjunath. The music is composed by Charan Banzo, who had worked in Telugu films under the name Chinni Charan. The film marks the Kannada debut for the lead actress Akanksha Puri. The principal photography of the film began in 2013 and took a long period to complete.

Cast
 Komal Kumar 
 Akanksha Puri as Akanksha
 Shayaji Shinde
 Avinash
 Gopinath Bhat
 Naveen Krishna
 Heena Panchal in item number
 Vanishree

Soundtrack
The soundtrack is composed and written by Charan Banzo, a debutant. Anand Audio has bought the audio rights of the film. A special song dedicated to veteran actor Vishnuvardhan was recorded in the voice of S. P. Balasubrahmanyam and penned by Hrudaya Shiva.

Track listing

Release
Initially, the film was planned to release on 31 July 2014. However, due to the lack of theaters and the filmmakers adherence for a particular main theater has pushed the release to an unspecified date. Finally the film released on 31 July 2015.

References

External links
 
'Lodde' shooting progresses silently

2015 films
2015 romantic comedy films
2010s Kannada-language films
Indian romantic comedy films